This is a list of the best-selling singles in 1997 in Japan, as reported by Oricon.

References

1997 in Japanese music
1997
Oricon
Japanese music-related lists